This is a list of seasons completed by the Michigan State Spartans football team of the National Collegiate Athletic Association (NCAA) Division I Football Bowl Subdivision (FBS). Since the team's creation in 1885, the Spartans have participated in more than 1,200 officially sanctioned games, including 30 bowl games.

Michigan State originally competed as a football independent. In 1896, MSU joined the Michigan Intercollegiate Athletic Association. The Spartans then competed independently again from 1907 through 1952. In 1953, MSU joined the Big Ten conference, where it has been a member ever since.

Seasons

1Helms Athletic Foundation and Poling System awarded the national championship to Michigan State.
2College Football Researchers Association, Helms Athletic Foundation, National Football Foundation, and Poling System awarded the national championship to Michigan State.
3Michigan State later forfeited all wins due to academic scandal.
4NCAA introduced overtime, thus ending possible outcome of ties.
5 Dantonio suffered a heart attack for which he was hospitalized, and received a coronary stent. While he recovered, offensive coordinator Don Treadwell stepped in as acting head coach, leading the Spartans against Northern Colorado and Wisconsin.

References

Michigan State

Michigan State Spartans football seasons